The Singapore Media Academy (SMA), a wholly owned subsidiary of Mediacorp, is a media continuing education and training (CET) centre for creative industries. Incorporated in November 2005, the Academy offers training, educational and consultancy services to address the needs of the local and regional media industries.

Continuing Education and Training (CET) Centre
The Singapore Media Academy was appointed by the Singapore Workforce Development Agency (WDA) in October 2008 as a media continuing education and training (CET) centre to offer workforce skills qualifications (WSQ) training under the Creative Industries WSQ (CI WSQ) framework, which was developed to address manpower and training needs of the media industry in Singapore.

The Academy currently has a campus at Mediacorp Campus.

References

Education in Singapore
Organisations based in Singapore
Educational organisations based in Singapore
Broadcasting schools
Educational institutions established in 2005
Mediacorp
2005 establishments in Singapore